Torfrock (lit. "Peat Rock") is a German rock group founded by Klaus Büchner and Raymond Voß in 1976. Guitarist Jürgen Lugge from Hamburg played lead guitar until his unexpected death in 1992. With their Northern German identity, they are notable for keeping alive the native Low German language in their lyrics. With many of their songs being Low-German covers of Anglo-American standards, their music style ranges from R'n'B to blues rock and folk rock.

Their humorous to surreal song lyrics mostly deal either with 10th-century Viking Rollo (in an interpretation obviously strongly reminiscent of Dik Browne's Hägar the Horrible rather than the actual historical person) situated in Hedeby instead of Skandinavia in their songs, or life in the modern-day fictional Schleswig-Holstein rural village of Torfmoorholm (lit. "Peatbogville").

Beside being a trademark of modern-day Northern German culture, the band is closely associated with another Northern German icon, the Werner comics and movie franchise created by comic artist Rötger Feldmann (aka Brösel), not only because the band wrote the original soundtrack to the first Werner movie and partly to its sequels, but also because Torfrock singer Büchner voices character Werner in the movies. Also, Torfrock guitarist and singer Voss voices the Präsi, the choleric leader of a biker gang Werner is a member of.

Gallery

Discography

Studio albums
 Dat matscht so schön (It splashes so nicely, 1977)
 Rata-ta-zong (1978)
 Torfrockball im Hühnerstall (Torfrock party in the chicken's barn, 1979)
 Vierter Versuch (Fourth attempt, 1980)
 Mein Gott, sind wir begabt (My god, are we talented, 1982)
 Alle an die Ruder (All hands to the oars, 1990)
 Aufe beinharte Tour (The rough way, lit. On the bone-hard tour, 1991, Live) – soundtrack for the film adaptation of the Werner comics
 Torfrock oder Watt? (Torfrock or mudflat?, pun on Torfrock oder was? [...or what?], 1991, Remix)
 Beinhart - geht das ab hier (Hard to the bone - everything is fine here, 1991)
 Die Bagaluten-Fete (The Bagalute party, 1992)
 Goiler Tonträger (Cool sound medium, 1994)
 Die Wikinger (The Vikings, 1995, Compilation)
 Rockerkuddl (1996)
 Beinhart - Alle Hits (2000, Compilation)
 Einigkeit und Blech und Freizeit (Unity and tin and spare time, a pun on the first lines of the German national anthem ["Einigkeit und Recht und Freiheit" - Unity and right and liberty] 2001)

Videography
 Aufe Beinharte Tour (1992)
 Torfrock - Die Beinharte Bagaluten-Weihnacht (2002)

External links 

 Official web site

German musical groups